United States sanctions imposed against other countries include:
 bans on arms-related exports,
 controls over dual-use technology exports,
 restrictions on economic assistance, and
 financial restrictions such as:
 requiring the United States to oppose loans by the World Bank and other international financial institutions,
 diplomatic immunity waived, to allow families of terrorism victims to file for civil damages in U.S. courts,
 tax credits for companies and individuals denied, for income earned in listed countries,
 duty-free goods exemption suspended for imports from those countries,
 authority to prohibit U.S. citizens from engaging in financial transactions with the government on the list, except by license from the U.S. government, and
 prohibition of U.S. Defense Department contracts above $100,000 with companies controlled by countries on the list.

According to American Studies academic Manu Karuka, the United States has imposed two-thirds of the world's sanctions since the 1990s. Numerous US unilateral sanctions against various countries around the world have been criticized by different commentators. It has imposed economic sanctions on more than 20 countries since 1998.

History 
After the failure of the Embargo Act of 1807, the federal government of the United States took little interest in imposing embargoes and economic sanctions against foreign countries until the 20th century. United States trade policy was entirely a matter of economic policy. After World War I, interest revived. President Woodrow Wilson promoted such sanctions as a method for the League of Nations to enforce peace. However, he failed to bring the United States into the League and the US did not join the 1935 League sanctions against Italy. However, in 1940, the United States participated in the ABCD line against Japan, and the Helium Act of 1925 forbade the export of that strategic commodity. Interest in trade as a tool of foreign policy expanded during the Cold War era, and many economic sanctions were applied.

Trends in whether the United States has unilaterally or multilaterally imposed sanctions have changed over time. During the Cold War, the United States led unilateral sanctions against Cuba, China, and North Korea. Following the disintegration of the Soviet Union and the end of the Cold War, United States sanctions became increasingly multilateral. 

In September 1988, following reports of continuing chemical and biological weapons attacks against Iraq's Kurdish minority by the Saddam Hussein regime, United States senators Claiborne Pell and Jesse Helms called for comprehensive economic sanctions against Iraq, including an oil embargo. Several U.S. commercial interests with ties to Iraq lobbied against the sanctions. (See Sanctions against Iraq, Feyli Kurdish Genocide, Anfal Campaign.) The United Nations Security Council subsequently passed sanctions against Iraq following Iraq's invasion of Kuwait in 1990. 

During the 1990s, the United States imposed sanctions against countries it viewed as rogue states (such as Zimbabwe, Yugoslavia, and Iraq) in conjunction with multilateral institutions such as the United Nations or the World Trade Organization. According to communications studies academic Stuart Davis and political scientist Immanuel Ness, in the 2000s, and with increasing frequency in the 2010s, the United States acted less multilaterally as it imposed sanctions against perceived geopolitical competitors (such as Russia or China) or countries that, according to Davis and Ness, were the site of "proxy conflicts" (such as Yemen and Syria).

Beginning in 2012 the U.S. Congress and several other countries passed Magnitsky Acts in response to the torture and murder of lawyer Sergei Magnitsky who had uncovered tax fraud and money laundering in Russia. (See Magnitsky Act.) One purpose of the acts was to be able to individually sanction serious human rights violators without targeting whole countries.  

During the COVID-19 pandemic, the United Nations High Commissioner for Human Rights Michelle Bachelet and some members of the United States Congress asked the United States to suspend its sanctions regimes as way to help alleviate the pandemic's impact on the people of sanctioned countries. Members of Congress who argued for the suspension of sanctions included Bernie Sanders, Alexandria Ocasio-Cortez, and Ilhan Omar.

The United States applies sanctions more frequently than any other country and does so by a wide margin. According to American Studies academic Manu Karuka, the United States has imposed two-thirds of the world's sanctions since the 1990s.

Targeted parties

Countries 

As of November 2022, the United States has sanctions against:

Persons 

Some of the countries which are listed are members of the World Trade Organization, but WTO rules allow trade restrictions for non-economic purposes.

Combined, the Treasury Department, the Commerce Department and the State Department list sanctions concerning these countries or territories: 

 (sanctioned areas)

War in Ukraine

As of February 2022, following the 2022 Russian invasion of Ukraine, the United States has sanctions against:

Individuals

Russia
Targeted Russian elites:
Sergei Sergeevich Ivanov
Sergei Borisovich Ivanov
Andrey Patrushev
Nikolai Platonovich Patrushev
Ivan Igorevich Sechin
Igor Ivanovich Sechin
Alexander Aleksandrovich Vedyakhin
Andrey Sergeyevich Puchkov
Yuriy Alekseyevich Soloviev
Galina Olegovna Ulyutina

Belarus
Leader of :
Aliaksandr Yauhenavich Shatrou

Belarusian Defense Officials:
Viktor Khrenin
Aleksandr Grigorievich Volfovich
Aliaksandr Mikalaevich Zaitsau

Perceptions

Since 1990, the use of sanctions by the United States significantly increased, and since 1998, the United States has established economic sanctions on more than 20 countries.

A series of studies led by economist Gary Hufbauer have found that destabilization of the sanctioned country is the frequent goal of United States sanctions programs. Destabilization occurs when people in the sanctioned country (1) lose confidence in their government's ability to operate the country and (2) viable alternatives exist for them to consider.

Sanctions, according to Daniel T. Griswold, failed to change the behavior of sanctioned countries; but they have barred American companies from economic opportunities, and harmed the poorest people in the countries under sanctions. Secondary sanctions, according to Rawi Abdelal, often separate the United States and Europe because they reflect US interference in the affairs and interests of the European Union (EU). Since Donald Trump became the president of the United States, Abdelal believes, sanctions have been seen not only as an expression of Washington's preferences and whims, but also as a tool for US economic warfare that has angered historical allies such as the EU.

Criticisms of efficacy
The increase in the use of economic leverage as a US foreign policy tool has prompted a debate about its usefulness and effectiveness. According to Rawi Abdelal, sanctions have become the dominant tool of statecraft of the US and other Western countries in the post-Cold War era. Abdelal stated; "sanctions are useful when diplomacy is not sufficient but force is too costly".  British diplomat Jeremy Greenstock said sanctions are popular because "there is nothing else [to do] between words and military action if you want to bring pressure upon a government". Former CIA Deputy Director David Cohen writes, "The logic of coercive sanctions does not hold, however, when the objective of sanctions is regime change. Put simply, because the cost of relinquishing power will always exceed the benefit of sanctions relief, a targeted state cannot conceivably accede to a demand for regime change."

Most international relations scholarship concludes that sanctions almost never lead to overthrow of sanctioned countries' governments or compliance by those governments. More often, the outcome of economic sanctions is that state elites in the sanctioned country become more entrenched in power. In a study of United States sanctions from 1981 to 2000, political scientist Dursan Peksen found that sanctions have been counterproductive, failing to improve human rights and instead lead to sanctioned countries' further decrease of their "respect for physical integrity rights, including freedom from disapperances, extrajudicial killings, torture, and political imprisonment." Economists Hufbauer, Schott, and Elliot state that while policymakers often have high expectations of the efficacy of sanctions, there is at most a weak correlation between economic deprivation and the political inclination to change. Griswold writes that sanctions are a foreign policy failure, having failed to change the political behavior of sanctioned countries but they have barred American companies from economic opportunities and harmed the poorest people in the sanctioned countries. A study by the Peterson Institute for International Economics said sanctions have achieved their goals in fewer than 20% of cases. Griswold argues, as an example, that the US Nuclear Proliferation Prevention Act of 1994 could not stop Pakistan and India from testing nuclear weapons.

Political scientist Lisa Martin critiques a game theory view of sanctions, stating that sanctions proponents characterize success so broadly (applying it to a range of outcomes from "renegotiation" to "influencing global public opinion), that the terminology of "winning" or "losing" stretches those concepts too far.

Humanitarian criticisms 
Daniel T. Griswold of the Cato Institute criticizes sanctions from a conservative Christian perspective, writing that sanctions limit the possibilities of a sanctioned country's people to exercise political liberties and practice market freedom.
In 1997, the American Association for World Health stated that the United States embargo of Cuba contributed to malnutrition, poor water access, lack of access to medicine and other medical supplies and concluded that "a humanitarian catastrophe has been averted only because the Cuban government has maintained a high level of budgetary support for a health care system designed to deliver primary and preventative medicine to all its citizens."

Economist Helen Yaffe estimates United States sanctions against Venezuela to have caused the deaths of 100,000 people due to the difficulty of importing medicine and health care equipment.

According to the Middle East News Agency, the West, led by America and Europe, has not sent any immediate aid to Syria after the 2023 Turkey–Syria earthquake. According to this report, the mainstream media has falsely claimed that President Bashar al-Assad does not allow humanitarian aid to reach the Turkish-occupied northwestern provinces of Syria, including border crossings. "the goal is to get the Syrian people to blame their president for western countries’ refusal to provide aid," a Western diplomat confirmed.

Isolation of the United States and its markets
According to Abdelal, US sanctions on its own internal economy cost almost nothing but overuse of them could be costly in the long run. Abdelal said the biggest threat is the US's gradual isolation and the continuing decline of US influence in the context of an emerging multi-polar world with differing financial and economic powers. Abdelal also said the US and Europe largely agree on the "substance" of sanctions but disagree on their implementation. The main issue is secondary US sanctions—also known as extraterritorial sanctions—which prohibit any trading in US dollars and prevent trade with a country, individuals and organizations under the US sanctions regime. Primary sanctions restrict US companies, institutions, and citizens from doing business with the country or entities under sanctions. According to Abdelal, secondary sanctions often separate the US and Europe because they reflect US interference in the affairs and interests of the EU. The more secondary sanctions are applied, the more they are seen in the EU as a violation of national and EU sovereignty—as an unacceptable interference in the EU's independent decision making. The secondary sanctions imposed on Iran and Russia are central to these tensions, and have become the primary tool for signaling and implementing secession from US and European political goals.

In 2019, the United States Department of State reported that it received complaints from American telecommunications providers and television companies that sanctions against Cuba made it difficult for them to incorporate the country into their grid coverage.

De-dollarization efforts 
Retired business studies academic Tim Beal views the United States' imposition of financial sanctions as a factor increasing dedollarization efforts because of responses like the Russian-developed System for Transfers of Financial Messages (SPFS), the China-supported Cross-Border Interbank Payment System (CIPS), and the European Instrument in Support of Trade Exchanges (INSTEX) that followed the United States' withdrawal of from the Joint Comprehensive Plan of Action (JCPOA) with Iran.

Historian Renate Bridenthal writes that "the most looming blowback to US sanctions policy is the growing set of challenges to dollar hegemony." Bridenthal cites the use of local currencies to trade with sanctioned countries as well as attempts by Russia and China to increase the gold backing of their respective currencies.

Sanctions as measures against opposition

Farrokh Habibzadeh of the Iranian Petroleum Industry Health Organization, wrote a letter to The Lancet, comparing the strategy of sanctions to besieging in ancient times, where armies that could not conquer a city that was surrounded by defensive walls would besiege the city to prevent access by residents to necessary supplies. According to Hufbauer, Schott and Elliot (2008), regime change is the most-frequent foreign policy objective of economic sanctions, accounting for just over 39% of cases of their imposition.

Cuba

There have been 29 consecutive nearly unanimous UN General Assembly resolutions demanding the US end its embargo of Cuba. When the US imposed its the first comprehensive commercial embargo on Cuba in 1961, Cuba did most of its commerce with the US. Griswold said since then, the sanctions have not had any effect on Fidel Castro's government, which used sanctions to justify the failure of policies and to attract international compassion. Griswold said although the sanctions formerly had international backing, as of 2000 no other country supported them. Pope John Paul II stated during his visit to Cuba, embargoes "are always deplorable because they harm the needy".

Iran

In May 2018, the US government announced its withdrawal from the Joint Comprehensive Plan of Action (JCPOA) and launched a maximum pressure campaign against Iran, which resulted in public protests, and reproach from European political and business elites. Excessive use of US financial sanctions has worried companies and prompted many EU member states and institutions to limit the exposure of their economies to the US-based clearing system that creates extreme vulnerability for all countries other than the US. The Trump administration reintroduced sanctions against Iran with an executive order, going against the wishes of many politicians.

Iraq

In 1990, the Iraqi Army invaded and occupied Kuwait, which was met with international condemnation and brought immediate sanctions against Iraq. The effects of sanctions on the population of Iraq have been disputed. The figure of 500,000 child deaths was widely cited for a long period but in 2017, research showed that figure was the result of survey data manipulated by the Saddam Hussein regime. Three surveys conducted since 2003 all found the child mortality rate between 1995 and 2000 was approximately 40 per 1000, meaning there was no major rise in child mortality in Iraq after sanctions were implemented.

Economic engagement as an alternative

Denis Halliday  argued that sanctions in Iraq forced people to depend on the ruling dictatorship for their survival and further reduced the likelihood of a constructive solution. He commented:We have saved [the regime] and missed opportunities for change ... if the Iraqis had their economy, had their lives back, and had their way of life restored, they would take care of the form of governance that they want, that they believe is suitable to their country.

Implementing agencies 
 Bureau of Industry and Security
 Directorate of Defense Trade Controls
 Office of Foreign Assets Control
 U.S. Customs and Border Protection 
 United States Department of Commerce (Export Administration Regulations, EAR)
 United States Department of Defense
 United States Department of Energy (nuclear technology)
 United States Department of Homeland Security (border crossings)
 United States Department of Justice (including ATF and FBI)
 United States Department of State (International Traffic in Arms Regulations, ITAR)
 United States Department of the Treasury

Authorizing laws 
Several laws delegate embargo power to the President:
 Trading with the Enemy Act of 1917
 Foreign Assistance Act of 1961
 International Emergency Economic Powers Act of 1977
 Export Administration Act of 1979

Several laws specifically prohibit trade with certain countries:
 Cuban Assets Control Regulations of 1963
 Cuban Democracy Act of 1992
 Helms–Burton Act of 1996 (Cuba)
 Iran and Libya Sanctions Act of 1996
 Trade Sanction Reform and Export Enhancement Act of 2000 (Cuba)
 Iran Freedom and Support Act of 2006
 Comprehensive Iran Sanctions, Accountability, and Divestment Act of 2010

Footnotes

See also
 State Sponsors of Terrorism (U.S. list) – placement on the list puts severe restrictions on trade with that nation
 Specially Designated Nationals and Blocked Persons List
 United States sanctions against China
 Caesar Syria Civilian Protection Act
 Rogue state
 Economic sanctions
 2002 United States steel tariff
 Permanent normal trade relations
 Arms Export Control Act
 United States and state terrorism
 Criticism of United States foreign policy

References

Citations

Sources

Further reading

 Hufbauer, Gary C. Economic sanctions and American diplomacy (Council on Foreign Relations, 1998) online.
 Hufbauer, Gary C., Jeffrey J. Schott, and Kimberley Ann Elliott.  Economic Sanctions Reconsidered: History and Current Policy (Washington DC: Peterson Institute for International Economics, 1990)
 Mulder, Nicholas. The Economic Weapon: The Rise of Sanctions as a Tool of Modern War (2022)  also see online review

External links

 Sanctions Programs and Country Information (United States Department of the Treasury)
 Commerce Control List (Bureau of Industry and Security)

Foreign relations of the United States
United States trade policy
Embargoes
 
United States foreign policy
United States foreign policy
Foreign policy